Nikolayevka is a rural locality (a selo) and the administrative center of Nikolayevsky Selsoviet of Zeysky District, Amur Oblast, Russia. The population was 269 as of 2018.

Geography 
Nikolayevka is located 35 km southwest of Zeya (the district's administrative centre) by road. Nikolayevka-2 is the nearest rural locality.

References 

Rural localities in Zeysky District